Fotbal Club Petrocub Hîncești, commonly known as Petrocub Hîncești, or simply Petrocub, is a Moldovan football club from Hîncești. They play in the Moldovan Super Liga, the top division in Moldovan football. Its home ground is Municipal Stadium in Hîncești.

History
1994 – foundation as Petroclub-Condor Sărata-Galbenă
1995 – renamed Spicul Sărata-Galbenă
1998 – renamed  Petrocub-Spicul Sărata-Galbenă
2000 – renamed  Petrocub-Condor Sărata-Galbenă
2001 – renamed  FC Hîncești
2005 – renamed  Petrocub Sărata-Galbenă
2013 – renamed  Rapid-2 Petrocub
2015 – renamed  FC Petrocub Hîncești

Honours
Moldovan Cup
 Winners: 2019–20

Divizia B
 Winners: 2004–05, 2013–14

Current squad

European record

Legend: GF = Goals For. GA = Goals Against. GD = Goal Difference.

Recent seasons

References

External links

FC Petrocub Sărata-Galbenă at soccerway.com

 
Association football clubs established in 1994
Football clubs in Moldova